The Bishop of Whitby is an episcopal title used by a suffragan bishop of the Church of England Diocese of York, in the Province of York, England. The title takes its name after the town of Whitby in North Yorkshire; the See was erected under the Suffragans Nomination Act 1888 by Order in Council dated 30 July 1923. The Bishop of Whitby oversees the Archdeaconry of Cleveland. On 3 July 2014 Paul Ferguson was consecrated as Bishop of Whitby.

The Bishop of Whitby formerly had episcopal oversight of traditionalist parishes in the whole Diocese of York. Bates agreed not to ordain women and Ladds and Warner were both opponents of the ordination of women; however with the appointment of Ferguson, a supporter of women's ordination, oversight has been passed to Glyn Webster, Bishop of Beverley (as PEV.)

List of bishops

References

External links
 Crockford's Clerical Directory - Listings

 
Anglican suffragan bishops in the Diocese of York